The 1878 Delaware gubernatorial election was held on November 5, 1878. Incumbent Democratic Governor John P. Cochran was unable to seek re-election. Former State Senator John W. Hall ran as the Democratic nominee to succeed Cochran. The Republican Party, chastened by its long string of defeats, failed to run a statewide candidate. Instead, the Greenback Party stepped in, and Kensey Johns Stewart ran as the Greenback nominee. The absence of the Republican Party on the ballot caused turnout to crash, and Hall defeated Stewart by the largest margin in state history.

General election

Results

References

Bibliography
 
 
 
 Delaware Senate Journal, 77th General Assembly, 1st Reg. Sess. (1879).

1878
Delaware
Gubernatorial